The Great Blue Hole is a giant marine sinkhole off the coast of Belize. It lies near the center of Lighthouse Reef, a small atoll  from the mainland and Belize City. It was formed during several episodes of quaternary glaciation when sea levels were much lower. Analysis of stalactites found in the Great Blue Hole shows that formation took place 153,000, 66,000, 60,000, and 15,000 years ago. As the ocean began to rise again, the cave was flooded. The Great Blue Hole is a part of the larger Belize Barrier Reef Reserve System, a UNESCO World Heritage Site.

Exploration
The site was made famous by Jacques Cousteau, who declared it one of the top five scuba diving sites in the world. In 1971 he brought his ship, the Calypso, to the hole to chart its depths. Stalactites were retrieved from submerged caves, confirming their previous formation above sea level. Some of these stalactites were also off-vertical by 5˚ in a consistent orientation, indicating that there had also been some past geological shift and tilting of the underlying plateau, followed by a long period in the current plane. The tilt indicates that this was a movement of the land, rather than a rise in sea level alone.

An expedition was conducted in the summer of 1997 to collect core samples from the Blue Hole's floor and document the cave system. To accomplish these tasks, all of the divers had to be certified in cave diving and mixed gases.

In December 2018, two submarines descended into the Blue Hole in an attempt to map its interior. Using sonar scanning, the team was nearly able to complete a 3-D map of the 1,000 foot wide hole. The water at that depth and below becomes dark, anoxic and devoid of life. The submarine expedition also discovered the bodies of two divers at the bottom, out of three believed to have gone missing while diving there.

Tourism
The Great Blue Hole is a popular spot among recreational scuba divers who are lured by the opportunity to dive in sometimes crystal-clear water and meet several species of fish, including midnight parrotfish, Caribbean reef shark, and other juvenile fish species. Other species of shark, such as the bull shark and hammerheads, have been reported there but are not regularly sighted. Usually, day trips to the Great Blue Hole are full-day trips from the coastal tourist communities in Belize.

On-shore caves of similar formation, as large collapsed sinkholes, are well known in Belize and in the Yucatán Peninsula, where they are known as cenotes. Unlike the mainland cenotes which often link to underwater cave systems, there is little evidence of horizontal development in the Blue Hole. 

In 2012, Discovery Channel ranked the Great Blue Hole as number one on its list of "The 10 Most Amazing Places on Earth". In 2018, they featured a two-hour special titled Discovery Live: Into the Blue Hole featuring Erika Bergman, Fabien Cousteau and Richard Branson.

See also

 Blue hole
 List of caves in Belize

References

External links
  of the Great Blue Hole

Caves of Belize
Landforms of Belize
Mesoamerican Barrier Reef System
Sea caves
Sinkholes of North America
Underwater diving sites in Belize